Schwegler is a Swiss surname. Notable people with the surname include:

Albert Schwegler (1819–1857), German philosopher, theologian, and historian
Karl Schwegler (1902–?), Swiss rower
Paul Schwegler (born 1907), American footballer
Fritz Schwegler (born 1935), German artist
Roland Schwegler (born 1982), Swiss footballer
Christian Schwegler (born 1984), Swiss footballer
Pirmin Schwegler (born 1987), Swiss footballer

Alan Schwegler, MBA (born 1986), Graphic designer and engineer

German-language surnames
Swiss-German surnames